RMM Records, also known as RMM Records & Video Corp, was an independent Latin music record label established in 1987 and based in New York City. The label was most active during the late 1980s and early 1990s and produced primarily salsa, Latin jazz, and merengue music. At its peak, RMM Records employed 55 staff members and had distribution deals in 42 cities around the world, occupying 9,000 square feet in two floors at its Soho headquarters. The label was established by Fania Records promoter Ralph Mercado, who had established RMM Management in 1972 as an artist management and booking agency, providing bookings for Latin artists Tito Puente, Celia Cruz, and Ray Barretto.

Artists who recorded for the label included Tito Puente, Celia Cruz, Tito Nieves, Oscar D'Leon, Eddie Palmieri, Cheo Feliciano, Ismael Miranda, José Alberto "El Canario", Tony Vega, Johnny Rivera, Ray Sepúlveda, Domingo Quiñones, Miles Peña, Orquesta Guayacan, Conjunto Clasico, Manny Manuel, the New York Band, Marc Anthony & La India. Record producers included Sergio George, Isidro Infante, and Humberto Ramirez.

Empire and legacy
RMM filed for bankruptcy in November 2000, selling its assets to Universal Music Group.  According to the NY Times, unpaid royalties, as well as a lawsuit settlement of $7.7 million to Glenn Monroig totaling over $11 million, plus interest, contributed to the end of RMM Records. On June 25, 2001, as part of the Chapter 11 bankruptcy sale, Universal Music Group (UMG) announced the acquisition of RMM’s assets.

Founder and key staff
 Ralph Mercado Jr. (September 29, 1941 – March 10, 2009) was born in Brooklyn to a Puerto Rican mother and Dominican father. He entered the music business as a teenager, organizing parties and dances as president of a neighborhood social club. In the 1960s, he promoted R & B and soul artists like James Brown and paired them with Latin artists like Mongo Santamaria. In the 1980s-1990s, Mercado was a promoter of Latin Jazz, Latin rock, Merengue and Salsa.  He established a network of businesses that promoted concerts, managed artists, and led to the foundation of the record label Ritmo Mundo Musical (RMM). Following the bankruptcy of RMM in 2000, Ralph Mercado returned to artist promotion.
 Debra A. Mercado, starting in the early 1990s, was RMM's National Director of Publicity, as well as overseeing international promotions generated by RMM International.  She also was in charge of public relations for four other enterprises: RMM (Management), Ralph Mercado Presents, Caribbean Waves Music (ASCAP), and Crossing Borders Music Inc. (BMI).
 Damaris L Mercado, started her production career with her father while in her teens. She moved up the ranks from Production Assistant on concerts and music video projects traveling to different cities and countries and landing in Miami. There she worked out of the RMM Records office based in the Sony Discos headquarters as Manager of Production & Manufacturing eventually making her way back to New York City during the transition to Universal Music and culminating her position as Director of Global Production & Manufacturing.
George Nenadich, who has been with Sirius XM Radio on the Caliente channel for the last 11 years as host of the very popular classic salsa program "Salsa Nation" on Caliente, every Saturday morning at 10:00am EST, as well as Rumbon (a 24Hour classic salsa channel launched by George Nenadich with the program La Jungla de Rumbon every Friday night at 7pm EST), became part of RMM Records in November 1988 as Promotions Director. One of the first employees of the label along with Martha Cancel (who was there prior and managed the everyday operations of the label at that time, including promotions).

Familiar recordings
Combinación Perfecta 1993
Tropical Tribute to The Beatles 1996
Recordando a Selena 1996
En Vivo 1994 (recorded at Miami Arena, July 1993)
European Explosion 1996 (recorded at Cannes, February 1995)

Artists

 Tony Vega
 Van Lester
 Ray Sepúlveda
 Jesús Enríquez
 Guianko (also known as Yanko)
 Louie Ramirez
 Ray De La Paz
 3-2 Get Funky
 Tito Puente
 Humberto Ramírez
 Cheo Feliciano
 Miles Peña
 Vanessa
 Isidro Infante & La Elite
 José Alberto "El Canario"
 Tito Nieves
 Celia Cruz
 Giovanny Hidalgo
 Orquesta de la Luz (Co-Distributed by BMG Victor Japan)
 Pete "El Conde" Rodríguez
 Guayacán Orquesta
 Michael Stuart
 Ismael Miranda
 Antonio Cartagena
 Corinne
 Kevin Ceballo
 Johnny Rivera
 Oscar D'León
 Luis Perico Ortíz
 Marc Anthony
 Manny Manuel
 Frankie Morales
 La India
 Domingo Quiñones
 Los Hermanos Moreno
 Ray Perdomo
 Grupo Caneo
 Eddie Palmieri
 The New York Band
 Johnny Almendra & Los Jovenes del Barrio
 Robert Avellanet
 Lisandro Mesa
 Descarga Boricua
 Limi-T 21
 Matecaña Orquesta
 Fernando Echavarría y La familia André
 Sin Limite
 Willy Rivera
 Charlie Sepulveda
 Rubén Sierra
 Yorman
 Yari Moré
 Jerry Galante
 Issac Delgado
 Dave Valentin
 Chamy Solano
 Grupo Raíces
 Puerto Rico All Stars
 Aramis Camilo
 Marcos Caminero
 Monchy
 Ravel
 Cuco Valoy
 Mickey Perfecto
 Jandy Feliz
 Tres Equis
 Aníbal Bravo
 Vivanativa
 La Misma Gente
 Paymasi
 César Flores
 July Mateo "Rasputín"
 Los Nietos y Sergio Hernández
 Aleo
 Wichy Camacho
 Angelito Villalona
 Grupo Heavy
 Alberto Barros
 Henry Rosario
 Michel Camilo
 Deddie Romero
 Jerry Medina
 Raul Paz
 Hilton Ruiz
 Fausto Rey
 Antonio Cabán Vale "El Topo"
 K'stalia y Los Salchichas
 He'Pepo
 Cali Alemán
 Aleo
 Checo Acosta
 Alto Voltaje
 Andrés Mercedes
 Azucarado
 Lucecita Benítez
 Celinés
 Cherito
 Chrissy
 Conexión Salsera
 El Combo Show
 Bobby Cruz
 Paquito D’Rivera
 DJ Karlos
 Freddie Gerardo
 Pancho Gómez
 Grupo ABC
 Grupo Mandarina
 José Octavio
 La Artillería
 La Orquesta Joven
 Latino Man
 Los Bravos
 Jesse Márquez
 Luisito Martí
 Johan Minaya
 Glen Monroig
 Nettai Tropical Jazz Big Band
 José Nogueras
 Nora
 Orchestra 7
 Mickey Perfecto
 Millie Puente
 Sandy Reyes
 Roc & Kato
 Kike Santana
 Super Cuban All Stars
 José Manuel Taveras
 Juan Pablo Torres
 Charlie Valens
 Wellington
 Yolanda Duke
 Familia RMM
 TropiJazz All-Stars
 Sergio George

Labels
 SOHO Latino
 Sonero Discos
 RMM International
 TropiJazz
 Merengazo
 RMM Rocks

See also
 List of record labels
 Ralph Mercado

References

American independent record labels
Latin American music record labels
Jazz record labels
Record labels established in 1987
Record labels disestablished in 2001
Universal Music Latin Entertainment